Founders High School is a public secondary school in Bulawayo, Zimbabwe. It includes both day and boarding students.

History 
Founders High School was founded in January 1952 as Southern Rhodesia's first secondary school for Coloured and Asian students. It was established at the Herbert Stanley Hostel on Dundee Drive in the Barham Green area of Bulawayo. Today, most of its students are black Africans from suburbs including Emganwini, Nketa, Tshabalala, and Nkulumane.

In 2016, the school received an award called the Secretary's Bell

https://bulawayo24.com/index-id-opinion-sc-whatsapp+updates-byo-73375.html

Notable people

Alumni 
 Fay Chung, educator and politician, cabinet minister
 Rashid Gatrad, consultant paediatrician and deputy lieutenant of the West Midlands
 Noel Kaseke, footballer
 Edwin Muguti, surgeon and former deputy minister

 Fortune Chasi,Politician and Lawyer
 Prince James Mpande Ncube, Architect

Faculty 
 Andrew Shue, taught mathematics from 1989 to 1992

References 

1952 establishments in Southern Rhodesia
Buildings and structures in Bulawayo
Educational institutions established in 1952
High schools in Zimbabwe